Eurycorypha is a genus of insect in family Tettigoniidae, commonly known as Bush crickets. The genus is indigenous to Sub-Saharan Africa and Madagascar, and contains the following species:

 Eurycorypha adicra
 Eurycorypha aequatorialis
 Eurycorypha arabica
 Eurycorypha brevicollis
 Eurycorypha brevipennis
 Eurycorypha brunneri
 Eurycorypha canaliculata
 Eurycorypha cereris
 Eurycorypha cuspidata
 Eurycorypha darlingi
 Eurycorypha diminuta
 Eurycorypha fallax
 Eurycorypha flavescens
 Eurycorypha gramineus
 Eurycorypha kevani
 Eurycorypha klaptoczi
 Eurycorypha laticercis
 Eurycorypha lesnei
 Eurycorypha meruensis
 Eurycorypha montana
 Eurycorypha mutica
 Eurycorypha ornatipes
 Eurycorypha pianofortis
 Eurycorypha prasinata
 Eurycorypha proserpinae
 Eurycorypha punctipennis
 Eurycorypha securifera
 Eurycorypha simillima
 Eurycorypha spinulosa
 Eurycorypha stenophthalma
 Eurycorypha strangulata
 Eurycorypha stylata
 Eurycorypha sudanensis
 Eurycorypha varia
 Eurycorypha velicauda
 Eurycorypha zebrata

References 

Phaneropterinae
Tettigoniidae genera